Livre du Saint-Sacrement ("The Book of the Blessed Sacrament") is a collection of pieces for organ on the subject of the Eucharist by the French composer Olivier Messiaen. It was composed from 1984–1985 and first performed in 1986.

Genesis and composition 
Le livre du Saint-Sacrement was commissioned by Ray Ferguson and the Detroit, Michigan chapter of the American Guild of Organists, and was intended to be premiered at an AGO national conference. Messiaen had been the organist at the Église de la Sainte-Trinité, Paris since 1931, and by his own account he brought to summation his years of experience improvising music for the liturgy in the composition of the Livre.

Structure 

The work contains 18 named sections:

 Adoro te (I adore Thee)
 La Source de Vie (The Fountain of Life)
 Le Dieu caché (The hidden God)
 Acte de Foi (Act of Faith)
 Puer natus est nobis (Unto us is born a Son)
 La manne et le Pain de Vie (The manna and the Bread of Life)
 Les ressuscités et la lumière de Vie (The resurrected ones and the Light of Life)
 Institution de l'Eucharistie (Institution of the Eucharist)
 Les ténèbres (The darkness)
 La Résurrection du Christ (The Resurrection of Christ)
 L'apparition du Christ ressuscité à Marie-Madeleine (The appearance of the risen Christ to Mary Magdalene)
 La Transsubstantiation (Transubstantiation)
 Les deux murailles d'eau (The two walls of water)
 Prière avant la communion (Prayer before Communion)
 La joie de la grâce (The joy of grace)
 Prière après la communion (Prayer after Communion)
 La Présence multipliée (The Presence multiplied)
 Offrande et Alleluia final (Offering and final Alleluia)

Premiere and Reception 
Le Livre du Saint-Sacrement was premiered at the Metropolitan United Methodist Church in Detroit, Michigan on July 1, 1986, by the organist . Reviews of the premiere in both The Diapason and The American Organist were positive, despite the unfavorable acoustic of the church and mechanical problems with the organ.

Notes

References 
 
 

1984 compositions
Compositions by Olivier Messiaen
Compositions for organ